Porsche Junior is a tractor manufactured by Porsche-Diesel from 1952 to 1963. It is powered by an air-cooled 14 hp 822 cc, single-cylinder diesel engine.

External links 

Porsche tractor history and facts
 PORSCHE-DIESEL-Club Europa e.V. – Porsche-Diesel-Club Europa e.V. – Forum, Tipps, Technik, Verein, Ersatzteile, Veranstaltungen, etc.
 A Porsche-Diesel homepage from Sweden
 Porsche Diesel Tractor Registry

Vehicles introduced in 1952

Junior